Pearse Wyse (2 March 1923 – 28 April 2009) was an Irish politician, a long-serving member of Fianna Fáil who was later an early member of the Progressive Democrats.

He was born in Cork in 1923, son of John Wyse (or Wise), pawnbroker's clerk, and his wife Julia (née Cronin), a native of Macroom. Wyse was educated at Greenmount national school in Cork, and at Cork College of Commerce, where he trained as a bookbinder and paper cutter. He was employed at the Eagle Printing Works, where by the early 1960s he became works manager, and was a longstanding member of the Irish Bookbinders' and Allied Trades Union.

He first held political office in 1960 when he was elected to Cork City Council. Five years later he was first elected to Dáil Éireann as a Fianna Fáil Teachta Dála (TD) and running mate of Jack Lynch at the 1965 general election for the Cork Borough constituency. Following boundary changes, he served as TD for Cork City South-East (1969–1977), Cork City (1977–1981) and Cork South-Central (1981–1992). He retired from national politics at the 1992 general election.

Wyse was appointed Parliamentary Secretary to the Minister for Finance in 1977 on the nomination of Jack Lynch, becoming Minister of State at the Department of Finance in 1978 when the structure of positions were changed. Wyse supported George Colley in the 1979 Fianna Fáil leadership election which was won by Charles Haughey, and he was dropped from the junior ministerial ranks.

Wyse opposed Haughey in every leadership challenge from when he assumed the role, becoming a member of the so-called Gang of 22. He was an associate of Desmond O'Malley and by 1985 he was completely disaffected from the party leadership. In early 1986, he joined the Progressive Democrats, founded by O'Malley. He held his seat as a Progressive Democrats TD at the 1987 and 1989 general elections.

Wyse's seat was retained by Pat Cox at the 1992 general election. He remained a member of Cork City Council until he retired in 1999, having held his seat for almost forty years. He also served as Lord Mayor of Cork in 1967 and 1974.

Wyse died on 28 April 2009 in Cork, aged 81.

References

 

1923 births
2009 deaths
Fianna Fáil TDs
Members of the 18th Dáil
Members of the 19th Dáil
Members of the 20th Dáil
Members of the 21st Dáil
Members of the 22nd Dáil
Members of the 23rd Dáil
Members of the 24th Dáil
Members of the 25th Dáil
Members of the 26th Dáil
Lord Mayors of Cork
Ministers of State of the 21st Dáil
Progressive Democrats TDs